Severe Tropical Storm Mirinae was a tropical cyclone of moderate intensity that struck Hainan Island, China and Northern Vietnam in late July 2016. The third named storm of the annual typhoon season, Mirinae formed on July 25, 2016 as a tropical depression west of Luzon, Philippines. On July 26, it moved west-northwestwards, and it had intensified into a tropical storm before making landfall on Hainan Island, China. After passing over Hainan, it intensified into a severe tropical storm and made landfall over the Red River Delta in Northern Vietnam late on July 27, and dissipated the next day.

In Hainan, economic losses reached US$56.9 million. In Vietnam, by July 29, the storm had left five people dead and five others missing. Severe damage to infrastructure was reported in Northern Vietnam, with damage to power lines causing blackouts and power cuts in some areas. Mirinae also sank 12 boats, destroyed the roofs of 1,425 houses and uprooted about 5,000 trees. Total damage in Vietnam reached US$323.9 million.

Meteorological history

The system's well defined low level circulation centre was located in a very favourable environment for further development, with low vertical windshear and very warm sea surface temperatures. Later that day the JTWC initiated advisories on the system and classified it as Tropical Depression 05W, as it moved north-westwards along the periphery of a subtropical ridge of high pressure. During the next day, as the system moved west-northwestwards, it continued to intensify was named Mirinae by the JMA after it had become a tropical storm. Mirinae subsequently weakened slightly as it made landfall later that day, near Wanning and crossed Hainan Island, before it re-intensified as it had moved into the Gulf of Tonkin. Mirinae subsequently weakened gradually over northern Vietnam, before it was last noted during July 28, as it dissipated to the north of Hanoi.

Preparations and impact
During July 26, the Stand By Signal No.1 was hoisted for the Chinese territories of Hong Kong and Macau by the Hong Kong Observatory and the Macao Meteorological and Geophysical Bureau. The China National Meteorological Center issuing a blue-alert for tropical storm. More than 25,000 fishing vessels in Hainan returned to harbor ahead of the storm. All passenger ships across the Qiongzhou Strait, between Hainan and Guangdong Province, were suspended on July 26. Economic losses in Hainan reached ¥380 million (US$56.9 million).

In Vietnam, Mirinae known as Cơn bão số 1 (the 1st storm in 2016). On July 27, one of the deputy prime ministers of Vietnam Trịnh Đình Dũng goes checking for the prevention of the system impacting Vietnam in Thái Bình and Haiphong Province. On the late of that day, Severe Tropical Storm Mirinae made landfall in Thái Bình, Nam Định, Ninh Bình and over Red River Delta in Northern Vietnam. A peak gust observed at a value of 47 m/s in Ba Lạt (Thái Bình province). Because of strong winds, the power lines causing blackouts and power cuts in Thái Bình, Nam Định, Ninh Bình, Hà Nam and some other areas. Mirinae's heavy rains brought in Northern and North–Central Vietnam, with rainfall from the storm exceeded  in Tam Đảo District, Vĩnh Phúc Province. By July 29, the storm had left 7 people dead and 3 others missing. Mirinae also sank 12 boats, destroyed the roofs of 1,425 houses and uprooted about 5,000 trees. Total damage in Vietnam reached ₫7.229 trillion ($323.9 million). Mirinae also brought heavy rainfall, flash floods and landslides in some provinces of northern and central parts of Laos and Thailand.

See also 
 Tropical Storm Mujigae (2009)
 Tropical Storm Koni
 Typhoon Rammasun
 Tropical Storm Nangka (2020)

References

External links 

JMA General Information of Severe Tropical Storm Mirinae (1603) from Digital Typhoon
The JMA's Best Track Data on Severe Tropical Storm Mirinae (1603) 
05W.MIRINAE from the U.S. Naval Research Laboratory

2016 Pacific typhoon season
Typhoons in Vietnam
Typhoons in China
July 2016 events in Asia
2016 disasters in Vietnam
2016 disasters in China
Minirae